Mr. Six is an advertising character that was used from 2004 to 2010 for an advertising campaign by the American theme park chain Six Flags. Appearing as an elderly man wearing a tuxedo and thick-framed glasses, he is usually shown stepping slowly off a bus before he suddenly performs a frenetic dance to an instrumental version of the Vengaboys song "We Like to Party" to invite stressed and overworked people to Six Flags.

Origin
According to USA Today, Mr. Six is the creation of Doner Advertising of Southfield, Michigan. The success of the ad became such that Six Flags toured the vintage bus featured in the ad to all of its 31 parks and sold T-shirts based on the Mr. Six advertisement. Mr. Six also appeared on the nationally broadcast U.S. TV morning show Good Morning America.

The first airing introduced Mr. Six as an apparently elderly, slow-moving man dressed in his trademark tuxedo and large glasses, entering a suburban neighborhood in a retro-style bus. The neighborhood's families are working hard but appear bored with doing so. Mr. Six slowly shuffles off the bus, then suddenly becomes more limber and performs a high-energy dance routine as "We Like to Party" begins playing. The suburban families happily board the bus and are driven to Six Flags, where Mr. Six dances around park guests and joins them on various attractions. The dance he performs borrows moves from the Melbourne shuffle, jumpstyle, and Techtonik. Subsequent ads showed different variations of Mr. Six dancing and inviting people to Six Flags. The role was, initially, non-speaking.

Six Flags did not disclose the identity of the actor playing Mr. Six for some time, but eventually it became known that Mr. Six was played by choreographer Danny Teeson. Teeson explained in 2018, "The first few years, I had a hefty NDA [non-disclosure agreement] agreement with my contract."

Mr. Six impersonators

On July 9, 2004, Six Flags Great America held a contest to find the best person who could impersonate the new "Ambassador of Fun" Mr. Six and dance like him. The reward would be $2,500 cash and other small prizes. About 200 people, who wore tuxedos and red bow ties, went out onto the stage and danced. The winner of the contest was 13-year-old Jordan Pope. Jim Crowley, Six Flags Great America marketing director, said, "Jordan truly embodies the spirit of Six Flags!...He had Mr. Six's unique dance moves down to a science, the crowd went wild when he took the stage!"

Retirement and revival
On November 29, 2005, Daniel Snyder, owner of the NFL's Washington Redskins, took over Six Flags and the next day, he announced the retirement of the ad campaign. Snyder said that Mr. Six was "pointless". Mr. Six and the "It's Playtime!" motto would be dropped and Six Flags' next ad campaign would be called "Friendly, Clean, Fast, Safe, Service." (Despite this, the mascot was still prominently featured at Six Flags theme parks on merchandise until his revival in 2009.) The Mr. Six campaign was replaced by the "More Flags, More Fun" campaign, which introduced an unnamed character shouting the tagline at viewers.

On February 2, 2009, Mr. Six began appearing in place of the unnamed Asian character in the "More Flags, More Fun" ads on the Six Flags website. In March 2009, Six Flags announced the return of Mr. Six to promote their 2009 season opening in numerous press releases. Mr. Six also resumed appearances in a number of new television commercials where he dances and says the "More Flags, More Fun" tagline, alongside his sidekick Little Six, a much younger version of himself.

Mr. Six appeared as a bobblehead in the Six Flags New for 2017 Announcement video.

Parodies 

 A 2004 episode of The Late Show with David Letterman featured a parody with show announcer Alan Kalter driving the Six Flags bus and "accidentally" running over Mr. Six.
 Mr. Six is also parodied in the Robot Chicken episode "Celebrity Rocket". In a sketch, Mr. Six appears at the site of a car accident and whisks all involved to Six Flags (including a woman, a man, a cop, and a corpse in a body bag). At one point, he dances behind the woman in a very provocative manner, causing the cop to yank him away from her. At the end, Mr. Six begins driving them away from Six Flags only to cause another fatal accident. As the bus passengers look on at the horrifying results, Mr. Six begins dancing again. The cop gets annoyed and shoots him in the head.
 Mr. Six was parodied twice on Saturday Night Live.
 Mr. Six was parodied on the February 23, 2008 episode hosted by Tina Fey. In the sketch, NBC has over-scheduled The Apprentice and dozens of spinoffs have been created, including one in which the contestants are TV commercial characters. Donald Trump (played by Darrell Hammond) asks Mr. Six (played by Amy Poehler) if he would dance for him. Mr. Six says he would rather not, but the skit ends with Mr. Six next to Trump dancing to "We Like to Party".
 On the April 16, 2022 episode, host Lizzo brings a date (played by Mikey Day) home, only for it to be revealed that her grandfather (played by Sarah Sherman), with whom she lives, is Mr. Six, referred to throughout the sketch as "The Six Flags Guy".  Further, it is revealed that her grandmother (Ego Nwodim) and their poker club (Aristotle Athari, Kate McKinnon, Kyle Mooney) are all also "Six Flags Guys".  The sketch ends with everyone doing the Mr. Six dance to "We Like to Party".

See also
List of American advertising characters

Footnotes

References

Male characters in advertising
Advertising characters
Six Flags
Corporate mascots
Mascots introduced in 2004